Jahan Ara Begum Surma (born 27 February 1958) is a Bangladesh Awami League politician and a former Jatiya Sangsad member from the Women's Reserved Seat-32.

Early life
Surma was born on 27 February 1958 and she has a H.S.C. degree.

References

Living people
1958 births
Awami League politicians
Women members of the Jatiya Sangsad
10th Jatiya Sangsad members
21st-century Bangladeshi women politicians
21st-century Bangladeshi politicians